South Korean boy band U-KISS has released eleven studio albums, two compilation albums, seventeen extended plays, seven live albums, thirty-five singles, five video albums and thirty music videos.

Albums

Studio albums

Compilation albums

Extended plays

Singles

Other charted songs

Videography

Video albums

Live albums

DVD/Blu-ray video

Music videos

uBEAT

uBEAT is the first sub-unit formed by U-KISS. The unit consists of Eli and AJ. They released their debut mini-album featuring fellow group member Kevin.

Extended plays

Singles

Notes

References

Discographies of South Korean artists
Discography
K-pop music group discographies